1080i (also known as Full HD or BT.709) is a combination of frame resolution and scan type. 1080i is used in high-definition television (HDTV) and high-definition video. The number "1080" refers to the number of horizontal lines on the screen. The "i" is an abbreviation for "interlaced"; this indicates that only the even lines, then the odd lines of each frame (each image called a video field) are drawn alternately, so that only half the number of actual image frames are used to produce video. A related display resolution is 1080p, which also has 1080 lines of resolution; the "p" refers to progressive scan, which indicates that the lines of resolution for each frame are "drawn" on the screen in sequence.

The term assumes a widescreen aspect ratio of 16:9 (a rectangular TV that is wider than it is tall), so the 1080 lines of vertical resolution implies 1920 columns of horizontal resolution, or 1920 pixels × 1080 lines. A  1920 pixels × 1080 lines screen has a total of 2.1 megapixels (2.1 million pixels) and a temporal resolution of 50 or 60 interlaced fields per second. This format is used in the SMPTE 292M standard.

Broadcast standard

Within the designation "1080i", the i stands for interlaced scan. A frame of 1080i video consists of two sequential fields of 1920 horizontal and 540 vertical pixels. The first field consists of all even-numbered TV lines and the second all odd numbered lines. Consequently, the horizontal lines of pixels in each field are captured and displayed with a one-line vertical gap between them, so the lines of the next field can be interlaced between them, resulting in 1080 total lines.

1080i differs from 1080p, where the p stands for progressive scan, where all lines in a frame are captured at the same time. In native or pure 1080i, the two fields of a frame correspond to different instants (points in time), so motion portrayal is good (50 or 60 motion phases/second). This is true for interlaced video in general and can be easily observed in still images taken of fast motion scenes. However, when 1080p material is captured at 25 or 30 frames/second, it is converted to 1080i at 50 or 60 fields/second, respectively, for processing or broadcasting. In this situation both fields in a frame do correspond to the same instant. The field-to-instant relation is somewhat more complex for the case of 1080p at 24 frames/second converted to 1080i at 60 fields/second; see telecine.

The field rate of 1080i is typically 60 Hz (i.e., 60 fields per second) for countries that use or used System M (NTSC and Brazilian PAL-M) as analog television system with 60 fields/sec (such as United States, Canada, Mexico, Japan, South Korea, Taiwan and Philippines), or 50 Hz for regions that use or used 625-lines (PAL or SECAM) television system with 50 fields/sec (such as most of Europe, most of Africa, China, India, Australia, New Zealand, Middle East, and others). Both field rates can be carried by major digital television broadcast formats such as ATSC, DVB, and ISDB-T International. The frame rate can be implied by the context, while the field rate is generally specified after the letter i, such as "1080i60". In this case 1080i60 refers to 60 fields per second. The European Broadcasting Union (EBU) prefers to use the resolution and frame rate (not field rate) separated by a slash, as in 1080i/30 and 1080i/25, likewise 480i/30 and 576i/25. Resolutions of 1080i60 or 1080i50 often refers to 1080i/30 or 1080i/25 in EBU notation.

1080i is directly compatible with some CRT HDTVs on which it can be displayed natively in interlaced form, but for display on progressive-scan—e.g., most new LCD and plasma TVs, it must be deinterlaced. Depending on the television's video processing capabilities, the resulting video quality may vary, but may not necessarily suffer. For example, film material at 25fps may be deinterlaced from 1080i50 to restore a full 1080p resolution at the original frame rate without any loss. Preferably video material with 50 or 60 motion phases/second is to be converted to 50p or 60p before display.

Worldwide, most HD channels on satellite and cable broadcast in 1080i. In the United States, 1080i is the preferred format for most broadcasters, with Warner Bros. Discovery, Paramount Global, and Comcast owned networks broadcasting in the format, along with most smaller broadcasters. Only Fox- and Disney-owned television networks, along with MLB Network and a few other cable networks, use 720p as the preferred format for their networks; A+E Networks channels converted from 720p to 1080i sometime in 2013 due to acquired networks already transmitting in the 1080i format. Many ABC affiliates owned by Hearst Television and former Belo Corporation stations owned by TEGNA, along with some individual affiliates of those three networks, air their signals in 1080i and upscale network programming for master control and transmission purposes, as most syndicated programming and advertising is produced and distributed in 1080i/p, removing a downscaling step to 720p. This also allows local newscasts on these ABC affiliates to be produced in the higher resolution (especially for weather forecasting presentation purposes for map clarity) to match the picture quality of their 1080i competitors.

Some cameras and broadcast systems that use 1080 vertical lines per frame do not actually use the full 1920 pixels of a nominal 1080i picture for image capture and encoding. Common subsampling ratios include 3/4 (resulting in 1440x1080i frame resolution) and 1/2 (resulting in 960x1080i frame resolution). Where used, the lower horizontal resolution is scaled to capture or display a full-sized picture. Using half horizontal resolution and only one field of each frame (possibly with added anti-alias filtering or progressive capture) results in the format known as qHD, which has frame resolution 960x540 and 30 or 25 frames per second. Due to the chosen 16x16 pixel size for a compressed video packet known as a macroblock as used in ITU H.261 to H.264 video standards, a 1080-line video must be encoded as 1088 lines and cropped to 1080 by the de-compressor. The 720-line video format divides perfectly by 16 and therefore does not require any lines to be wasted.

See also

 Field (video)
 High-definition television in the United States
 Interlaced video
 List of common resolutions
 Sony HDVS Wideband Analog Video
 Telecine
 Other common resolutions: 4320p 2160p 1080p 720p 576p 576i 480p 480i 360p 240p

References

External links
 High Definition (HD) Image Formats for Television Production (EBU technical publication)

Video formats
Television terminology